Minnesota State Highway 210 (MN 210) is a state highway in west-central, central, and northeast Minnesota, which runs from North Dakota Highway 210 (ND 210) at the North Dakota state line (at Breckenridge), and continues east to its eastern terminus at its intersection with MN 23 in Duluth near the Saint Louis River.

The route runs across Minnesota from west-central to northeast; connecting Fergus Falls, Brainerd, and Duluth. At the western terminus of MN 210, upon crossing the Red River, the roadway becomes ND 210 and feeds into ND 13.

Route description

MN 210 serves as an east–west route in west-central, central, and northeast Minnesota between Breckenridge, Fergus Falls, Staples, Baxter, Brainerd, Carlton, and Duluth.

For part of its route, MN 210 is concurrent with US Highway 10 (US 10) between Motley and Staples in central Minnesota. The highway crosses the Washington Street Bridge at the Mississippi River in Brainerd and the Saint Louis River in Thomson.

The portion of MN 210 in Aitkin County is officially designated the "Dale Wayrynen Memorial Highway". This same designation is also signed on MN 210 in Carlton County from Cromwell westbound to the county line with Aitkin County.

MN 210 passes through the Cuyuna Range in Crow Wing County and the Fond du Lac State Forest in Carlton County. Cuyuna Country State Recreation Area is located on the highway in Crow Wing County near Crosby and Ironton; northeast of Brainerd. Jay Cooke State Park is located on MN 210 in Carlton County. The park is located between Carlton and Fond du Lac (Duluth).

History

MN 210 was authorized on July 1, 1949 between then-US 61 (now MN 45) in Carlton and MN 23 in Duluth, acting as an eastern extension of US 210. Circa 1955, the highway was expanded on the west end of US 210, replacing former MN 3 from Staples to the North Dakota state line at Breckenridge. The original eastern segment was subsequently renumbered as part of MN 39 in 1956.

When US 210 was removed in 1970, the highway was redesignated MN 210. The historic original route of MN 210 between Carlton and Duluth was changed back at this time as well.

MN 210 runs along the original mainline of the Northern Pacific Railway as built westward from Carlton to Staples. Between Henning and Breckenridge, the highway runs along a former branch line of the Northern Pacific Railway. Most of the branch line has since been abandoned.

The western section of the highway, between Breckenridge and Fergus Falls, was originally part of Minnesota Constitutional Route 3. Between Fergus Falls and Henning, the highway was part of Constitutional Route 36. The section between Carlton and Motley was part of Constitutional Route 2.

US 210

MN 210 from Carlton to Motley, the eastern portion of the present day highway, was originally part of U.S. Route 210 from 1926 to 1970. During 1970, US 210 was decommissioned from Carlton to Motley and re-designated MN 210 that same year.

US 210 was originally commissioned in 1926 by the American Association of State Highway Officials, as one of the original US Highways.

In the 1934 numbering plan, US 210 from Carlton to Motley was slated to be re-designated as U.S. Route 208. The road was almost re-numbered because of a routing change in its parent road (US 10). Ultimately, US 10 was routed along former US 10N. US 208 was shown on some maps in the mid-1930s running from Carlton to Motley, but the number was not officially commissioned or signed, and US 210 kept its number.

Major intersections

References

External links

 Endpoints of historic U.S. Highway 210

210
210
U
Transportation in Wilkin County, Minnesota
Transportation in Otter Tail County, Minnesota
Transportation in Todd County, Minnesota
Transportation in Morrison County, Minnesota
Transportation in Cass County, Minnesota
Transportation in Crow Wing County, Minnesota
Transportation in Aitkin County, Minnesota
Transportation in Carlton County, Minnesota
Transportation in St. Louis County, Minnesota